The  Dallas Texans season was the first season for the Texans. They finished with a record of 6–2.

Regular season

Schedule

Standings

y – clinched regular-season title

x – clinched playoff spot

Playoffs

Roster

Awards

External links
1990 Dallas Texans on ArenaFan

Dallas Texans
Dallas Texans
Dallas Texans (Arena) seasons